Moresk (later Truro Moresk;) was an electoral division of Cornwall in the United Kingdom. Between 1979 and 2009, Moresk was a division of Carrick District Council, electing two councillors. After the district council was abolished in 2009, Truro Moresk was a division of the new unitary authority, Cornwall Council, covering 146 hectares of the north of Truro. It elected one member and was abolished in 2013, being absorbed by the Truro Boscawen and Ladock, St Clement and St Erme divisions.

Councillors

Cornwall Council

Carrick District Council

Election results

Cornwall Council division

2009 election

Carrick District Council division

2007 election

2003 election

1999 election

1995 election

1991 election

1987 election

1983 election

1979 election

See also

Politics of Cornwall
Carrick

References

Truro Moresk (electoral division)
Politics of Truro